Sternbergia vernalis is a bulbous flowering plant in the family Amaryllidaceae, subfamily Amaryllidoideae, which is sometimes used as an ornamental plant. It has yellow flowers which appear in spring. The species  is native to central and southwestern Asia (Turkmenistan, Tajikistan, Uzbekistan, Armenia, Azerbaijan, Georgia, Iran, Iraq, Lebanon, Syria and Turkey).

References

Plants described in 1989
Flora of Turkey
Flora of Lebanon and Syria
Flora of Georgia (country)
Flora of Azerbaijan
Flora of Armenia
Flora of Uzbekistan
Flora of Tajikistan
Flora of Turkmenistan
Flora of Iran
Amaryllidoideae